The 2022 ARCA Menards Series East was the 36th season of the ARCA Menards Series East, a regional stock car racing series sanctioned by NASCAR in the United States. The season began on February 15 with the Race to Stop Suicide 200 at New Smyrna Speedway and ended on September 15 with the Sioux Chief Showdown 200 at Bristol Motor Speedway.

Sammy Smith entered the season as the defending champion. He moved up to the main ARCA Series to replace Ty Gibbs in the No. 18 car for Kyle Busch Motorsports (previously a Joe Gibbs Racing car in 2021) in most of the races after turning 18 (the minimum age to race at all tracks) on June 4, 2022. However, Smith continued to drive full-time in the East Series in the KBM No. 18.

The race at Milwaukee also featured six female drivers competing in the race (Amber Balcaen, Toni Breidinger, Mandy Chick, Stephanie Moyer, Amber Slagle, and Rita Thomason), a record for the East Series.

Teams and drivers

Complete schedule

Limited schedule

Notes

Changes

Teams
 On August 30, 2021, Rev Racing confirmed that they will not field any full-time East Series cars in 2022 as they will now field 2 cars full-time in the main ARCA Series.
 On November 5, 2021, Alex Clubb announced that he would be starting his own ARCA team after having previously been a driver/co-owner of Tim Richmond's ARCA team until late in the 2021 season. His part-time schedule in his No. 03 car includes the combination races at Iowa and Milwaukee.
 On March 15, 2022, it was announced that Phoenix Racing would be returning to a NASCAR-sanctioned series for the first time since 2013 and Jake Finch, the son of team owner James Finch, would make his East Series debut at Five Flags Speedway in the team's No. 1 car. Finch and the team would also run the race at Nashville.
 On May 8, 2022, it was announced that Steve Austin, who previously drove for CCM Racing, would drive for a new team, T.C. Enterprises, full-time in 2023 with the possibility of partnering with another team to jointly field a car in some races in 2022.

Drivers
 On July 26, 2021, Taylor Gray stated to Mark Kristl from Frontstretch that he will return to the David Gilliland Racing No. 17 car full-time in 2022. Although he had plans to drive the car full-time in 2021, he only ran part-time after suffering an injury during the season.
 On August 30, 2021, it was announced that Rajah Caruth would drive full-time for Rev Racing in the main ARCA Series after driving full-time in the East Series in 2021.
 On October 29, 2021, GMS Racing announced that Daniel Dye would drive full-time in the main ARCA Series for the team after driving full-time in the East Series in 2021 for both them and Ben Kennedy Racing. On April 27, 2022, ARCA indefinitely suspended Dye due to his arrest on a felony battery charge in Volusia County, Florida. On May 13, ARCA announced that Dye would be reinstated after his charges were reduced by the Florida state attorney's office.
 On December 6, 2021, Steve Austin tweeted that he would be driving in the East Series for CCM Racing in the No. 22 car. He did not specify whether it would be full-time or part-time, although he has indicated that he and the team are trying to find sponsorship for him to run full-time and for Rookie of the Year. CCM team owner Eric Caudell was entered in the No. 22 car at Dover instead of Austin before withdrawing and Matt Wilson replaced Austin in the No. 22 at Nashville (until CCM withdrew the No. 22 and partnered with Fast Track Racing to jointly field the No. 10 car for Wilson in that race). On May 8, it was announced that Austin had left for, T.C. Enterprises, a new team that will run full-time in 2023 with the possibility of partnering with another team to jointly field a car in some races in 2022. On May 22, The Pit Lane revealed that Austin had been arrested on April 27 after a parole violation and has a history of legal issues (including identity theft as his real/legal name is Edward Hudson) and is a habitual felon. Despite this discovery, the sanctioning body has yet to officially announce that Austin will be suspended.
 On December 22, 2021, it was announced that Stephanie Moyer would run the full season in the No. 01 for Fast Track Racing after driving the majority of the 2021 season for the team.
 On January 18, 2022, it was announced that Caleb Costner would drive full time in the No. 14 for Last Chance Racing with Costner Motorsports. However, Costner only attempted New Smyrna for his own team Costner Weaver Motorsports.
 On January 28, 2022, it was announced that Leland Honeyman would run the full season in the No. 02 for Young's Motorsports.
 On the New Smyrna entry list, it was revealed that Ashton Higgins would make his debut in a No. 49 car owned by himself, but he withdrew. Instead, he and his team debuted at Five Flags. Higgins and the No. 49 car also withdrew from the race at Nashville. Higgins' 49 car would attempt the race at Bristol.
 Daniel Escoto was going to drive the No. 60 car for Josh Williams Motorsports in the season-opener at New Smyrna, but due to illness, he was replaced by Logan Misuraca. On March 15, 2022, it was announced that Escoto would run the remainder of the season in the car. However, Michael Lira would replace Escoto at Nashville. Lira would also attempt the season-finale at Bristol.
 On March 1, 2022, it was revealed that Tanner Arms would make his home-track debut at Nashville Fairgrounds Speedway. He would drive that car again at Bristol.
 On March 18, 2022, just after practice, Nate Moeller renumbered his No. 06 car to the No. 10 car for Fast Track Racing, since their normal driver Benny Chastain crashed his car in practice and had no backup.
 On April 1, 2022, it was revealed that Christian Rose would attempt 9 races in the main ARCA series, 5 races in the East Series, and 3 races in the West Series for Cook Racing Technologies.
 On May 25, 2022, it was announced that Brandon Jones would return to the East Series for the first time since 2019 as he would run two of the combination races with the main ARCA Series (Iowa and Bristol) in the No. 81 car for Joe Gibbs Racing. Although JGR sold their ARCA team to Kyle Busch Motorsports before the start of the 2022 season, this entry will be a JGR car and not a KBM car.

Crew chiefs
 On January 11, 2022, it was announced that Brad Parrott would be the crew chief for Rajah Caruth's No. 6 car for Rev Racing in 2022. Glenn Parker was Caruth's crew chief in 2021 when he ran part-time in the main ARCA Series and full-time in the East Series. His Rev Racing teammate Nick Sanchez also got a new crew chief for 2022, as Matt Bucher replaced Steve Plattenberger.

Manufacturers
 On October 7, 2021, a Frontstretch article revealed that Rev Racing would receive manufacturer support from Chevrolet in 2022, which they did not have in 2021 despite being a Chevrolet team.

Schedule
Dover Motor Speedway announced their 2022 race date in a tweet on September 29. The rest of the schedule was announced on November 19.

Note: Races highlighted in gold are combination events with the ARCA Menards Series.

Schedule changes
 The race at Southern National Motorsports Park was taken off the schedule and not replaced with another race at a different track, so there are now 7 races on the schedule instead of 8.
 The race at Five Flags Speedway moves from February to March.
 The race at Dover Motor Speedway moves two weeks earlier along with the weekend's Cup Series race, making it the third race of the season which makes the race at Nashville Fairgrounds Speedway (which is on the same weekend in 2022 that it was in 2021) the fourth race of the season.
 The combination race at Iowa Speedway moves from July to June.

Broadcasting
The TV lineup is similar to what it looked like in 2021, with NBC airing all of the non-combination races on tape delay, MAVTV airing the combination races at Iowa and Milwaukee, and Fox airing the season-finale at Bristol (which is also a combination race). However, USA Network will be the channel that the NBC races are aired on instead of NBCSN, which was shut down at the end of 2021.

NBC Sports TrackPass, which previously had the streaming rights to all of the NBC and MAVTV races, lost the rights to FloRacing. The Fox Sports App will stream the Bristol race.

Results and standings

Race results

Drivers' championship

Notes: 
 The pole winner also receives 1 bonus point, similar to the previous ARCA points system used until 2019 and unlike NASCAR. 
 Additionally, after groups of 5 races of the season, drivers that compete in all 5 races receive 50 additional points. This points bonus was given after the race at Iowa.
 Sammy Smith, Taylor Gray, Leland Honeyman, Stephanie Moyer and Brad Smith received this points bonus for having competed in the first 5 races of the season (New Smyrna, Five Flags, Dover, Nashville Fairgrounds, and Iowa).

(key) Bold – Pole position awarded by time. Italics – Pole position set by final practice results or rainout. * – Most laps led.

See also
 2022 NASCAR Cup Series
 2022 NASCAR Xfinity Series
 2022 NASCAR Camping World Truck Series
 2022 ARCA Menards Series
 2022 ARCA Menards Series West
 2022 NASCAR Whelen Modified Tour
 2022 NASCAR Pinty's Series
 2022 NASCAR Mexico Series
 2022 NASCAR Whelen Euro Series
 2022 SRX Series

References

ARCA Menards Series
ARCA Menards Series East
ARCA Menards Series East